Lissodrillia robusta is a species of sea snail, a marine gastropod mollusc in the family Drilliidae.

Description
The length of the shell varies between 3.9 mm and 5.4 mm.

Distribution
This species occurs in the Gulf of Mexico off Florida, Alabama and Mississippi; in the Atlantic Ocean off the Florida Keys.

References

 Fallon P.J. (2016). Taxonomic review of tropical western Atlantic shallow water Drilliidae (Mollusca: Gastropoda: Conoidea) including descriptions of 100 new species. Zootaxa. 4090(1): 1–363

External links
 

robusta
Gastropods described in 2016